Roll On is the second studio album by Australian punk rock band The Living End. It was released in Australia and New Zealand in November 2000, and internationally in March 2001.

The album was the band's last major work to feature drummer Travis Demsey. In the downtime following the album's release and subsequent tour, he would leave the band, to be replaced by Andy Strachan.

ARIA publicised that Roll On had officially achieved 2× platinum status in Australia in November 2007.

Background
Musically, the album marked a change from the sound of their debut album, The Living End. Roll On had a notably more polished sound (as compared to the rawer sound of the previous album). Horn sections featured on numerous songs, such as "Uncle Harry" and "Killing The Right". Whereas the previous album had displayed punk and rockabilly influences (by artists such as Green Day and Stray Cats), Roll On showed more Australian rock influences, particularly artists of the 80s Pub Rock era. The album even garnered comparison, by a few critics, to seminal punk band The Clash's creative breakthrough, London Calling. The album was recorded with producer Nick Launay, who had previously worked with artists such as Silverchair and Midnight Oil.

Track listing

Singles 
"Pictures in the Mirror", 2000 single – #18 Australia, Triple J Hottest 100, 2000 #19
"Roll On", 2000 single – #15 Australia, Triple J Hottest 100, 2001 #72
"Dirty Man", 2001 single
"Carry Me Home", 2001 radio promo

Personnel
The Living End
Chris Cheney – vocals, guitar
Scott Owen – double bass, backing vocals
Travis Demsey – drums

Additional musicians
 Jack Howard – trumpet
 Aidan McArtney – trombone
 Jeremy Smith – French horn
 Butch Lee – percussion
 Cameron Baines (from Bodyjar) – backing vocals
 Grant Relf (from Bodyjar) – backing vocals
 Tom Read (from Bodyjar) – backing vocals
 Jon Toogood (from Shihad) – backing vocals
 Tom Larkin (from Shihad) – backing vocals
 Gabriel Atkinson (from Weta) - backing vocals

Production
Nick Launay – record producer
 Andy Wallace – mixer

Charts

Weekly charts

Year-end charts

Certifications

References

2000 albums
2001 albums
The Living End albums
EMI Records albums
Reprise Records albums
Albums produced by Nick Launay